Loreto Normanhurst is an independent Catholic, primary and secondary day and boarding school for girls, located in Normanhurst, a suburb on the upper North Shore of Sydney, New South Wales, Australia.

Established in 1897, Loreto has a current enrolment of approximately 1,175 students from Year 5 to Year 12, including approx. 185 boarders, and is the largest girls' boarding school in New South Wales. In 2006, the school was named among the top ten innovative schools in Australia. Commencing in 2015, the school reopened their primary school for girls in years 5 and 6.

Loreto Normanhurst is affiliated with the Association of Heads of Independent Schools of Australia (AHISA), the Association of Independent Schools of New South Wales (AISNSW), the Australian Boarding Schools' Association (ABSA), the Alliance of Girls' Schools Australasia (AGSA), and is a member of the Association of Heads of Independent Girls' Schools (AHIGS).

The school is one of many around the world established by the Institute of the Blessed Virgin Mary, or Loreto Sisters, founded some 400 years ago by Mary Ward, and its Sydney sister school is Loreto Kirribilli. There are five other Loreto schools across Australia, in Melbourne, Ballarat, Adelaide, Brisbane and Perth.

History
Mother Gonzaga Barry led the Loreto nuns to Sydney from Ballarat, Victoria in 1892, establishing a school in rented premises at Randwick. Within five years, the school had grown significantly, and a separate school for the boarders was deemed necessary. Mother Gonzaga's prayers for an appropriate site were answered during a visit to Sydney in 1896, as Mother Oliver explained:

This land was purchased, and the foundation stone for the new convent was laid on 28 February 1897 by Cardinal Moran. The school opened late in 1897 as "Loreto Convent, Hornsby" with 15 boarders, many of them girls who had come from Randwick.

Although primarily a boarding school at this time, Loreto did accept a small number of day students from the local Hornsby area, including some young boys. Enrolments grew over the following decades; however, the Wars and Depression proved difficult times. Following World War II, the surrounding shire developed and day girl numbers began to equal that of boarders, gradually overtaking them to the present situation where there are many more day girls than boarders.

Principals

House system
As with most Australian schools, Loreto Normanhurst utilises a house system. The school currently has eight houses, which play an important role in the pastoral program at the school. They are:

The houses are an important part of the schools community. To keep the members of the houses together, they make sure the lockers are surrounded by the house mates.

Notable alumnae 
 Jenny Brockie – broadcaster
 Kate Eastman  – human rights lawyer and academic
 Catherine Livingstone – Chair of Telstra, former CEO of Cochlear
 Jessica McNamee – actor Home and Away, Packed to the Rafters, Battle of the Sexes, The Meg, The Vow, "Mortal Kombat"
 Clare Martin – CEO of ACOSS, former Chief Minister of the Northern Territory
 Zoe Naylor – actor, McLeod's Daughters
 Victoria Pendergast – Australian Winter Paralympic skier
 Emma Simkin – SBS journalist and reporter
 Kimberley Starr – novelist
 Monica Trapaga – singer and TV presenter
Montaigne  – musician
Gordi - musician
 Sophie Dwyer - Giants Netball Player

See also 

 List of Catholic schools in New South Wales
 List of boarding schools in Australia
 Catholic education in Australia

References

Further reading 
 Meagher, F. 1997. Loreto Normanhurst: A Century of Memories 1897-1997. Allen & Unwin: St. Leonards, NSW. .
 Emilsen, S. and Callaghan, M. 2006. A School With Spirit: Loreto Kirribilli. Alliance Distribution Service. .

External links

 Loreto Normanhurst website

Girls' schools in New South Wales
Educational institutions established in 1897
Catholic secondary schools in Sydney
Boarding schools in New South Wales
Catholic primary schools in Sydney
Hornsby Shire
Catholic boarding schools in Australia
Association of Heads of Independent Girls' Schools
1897 establishments in Australia
Normanhurst
Convents in Australia
Alliance of Girls' Schools Australasia